Al Sarraj or El Sarraj is an Arabic surname.

Notable people with this surname include:
 Abdel Hamid al-Sarraj (1925–2013), Syrian Army officer and political figure, Syrian strong man during the period of United Arab Republic and union of Egypt and Syria
 Abu Nasr as-Sarraj (died 988), Sufi sheikh and ascetic
 Eyad El-Sarraj (1944–2013), Palestinian psychiatrist
 Fayez al-Sarraj (born 1960), Libyan politician
 Mohammad Alsarraj (born 1998), Jordanian squash player

Surnames of Arabic origin